Isidore Newman School is a private, nondenominational, co-educational college preparatory school located on an  campus in the uptown section of New Orleans, Louisiana.

Jeré Longman of The New York Times described Isidore Newman as "one of Louisiana’s elite private schools."

History
Isidore Newman School was founded in 1903 by Isidore Newman, a New Orleans philanthropist and founder of the Maison Blanche department store chain. It opened its doors the following year as the Isidore Newman Manual Training School (the name was changed in 1931), and it was initially intended for Jewish orphans. Historically, Jewish charities supported the school.

The school buildings suffered damage due to wind and flooding caused by 2005's Hurricane Katrina and was closed for two months. It reopened in January 2006, and by October 2006 enrollment fully recovered.

, the school is the target of a sealed federal civil rights lawsuit, filed in 2018, related to Title IX violations in connection with a separate lawsuit against a student convicted of sexual battery.

Academics
Newman offers comprehensive education for students in grades pre-kindergarten through 12th grade, organized into Lower, Middle and Upper schools.

Eli N. Evans wrote in the 2005 book The Provincials: A Personal History of Jews in the South that Newman is "highly oriented to college admission."

The school is a member of the Independent Schools Association of the Southwest and the National Association of Independent Schools.

The school also offers four foreign languages, including Honors and/or AP classes in each language: French I-VII, Spanish I-VII, and Chinese I-IV.

In order to be on the honor roll, students must maintain a 3.67 GPA. This includes a one GPA point addition for both honors and AP courses.

Athletics
Newman's athletic teams compete in the Louisiana High School Athletic Association. 

The school fields teams on a number of sports, including baseball, basketball, cross country, football, golf, gymnastics, lacrosse, soccer, swimming, tennis, track and volleyball.

Athletics history
Pro Football Hall of Fame quarterback Peyton Manning attended the high school, leading their football team to a 34–5 record during his three seasons as its starter. He was named Gatorade Circle of Champions National Player-of-the-Year and Columbus (Ohio) Touchdown Club National Offensive Player-of-the-Year in 1993. While at Newman, he began wearing the #18 jersey in honor of his older brother Cooper, who was forced to give up football due to spinal stenosis. Younger brother Eli also wore the number when he became starting quarterback. Newman has since retired the #18 jersey and it can be seen hanging in the school gym. Peyton was among the most sought after high school players in the country and was recruited by 60 colleges. Cooper's son Arch, the current Newman quarterback, has been touted as one of the top players in the college recruiting class of 2023.

Billy Fitzgerald, veteran science teacher and baseball and basketball coach at Newman and the school's athletic director, was the subject of a profile by alumnus Michael Lewis entitled Coach: Lessons on the Game of Life (2005).

Jeremy Bleich, later selected in the First Round of the 2008 Major League Baseball Draft by the New York Yankees, played baseball for the school, graduating in 2005. In high school by his junior year he had what author Michael Lewis described as "a decent fastball, great command, a big-league change-up and charm to burn," and had over 40 colleges recruiting him. Bleich was named a 2005 first-team All-American by Collegiate Baseball (Louisville Slugger), a third-team All American by Baseball America, and the 2005 All-Metro Player of the Year. He was named All-State in Louisiana twice, was the 2004 and 2005 District Most Valuable Player, and in 2003-2005 was named a three-time All-District, All-Metro, and All-Orleans teams player.

In May 2010, ESPN.com ranked Newman at the top of a survey of which high schools produce the best NFL players — even though the school had at the time only produced three NFL players: Omar Douglas and the Manning brothers.

NFL wide receiver Odell Beckham Jr. graduated from Newman in 2011.

Championships
Newman held 89 State Championships as of April 2016.

Athletic facilities
The largest building on campus is the Cotonio Palaestra.

Enrollment
Newman has a student body of 1,055 and a faculty of 208, with an average class size of 15 students per class. Newman has 434 students in its lower school, 253 in its middle school, and 368 in its upper school.

Circa 2005 about 40% of the students were Jewish. Evans wrote that circa 2005 there was social distance between Jewish and non-Jewish students that began with private dances held by non-Jewish students.

Tuition and Financial Aid
The average cost of tuition per student per year is $22,466 for grades Pre-K through 5th and $27,235 for grades 6th through 12th.

According to Isidore Newman School, "for the 2020-21 school year, 22% of the student body received aid totaling approximately $2.8 million."

Principals and Heads of School
 James Edwin Addicott, Principal, 1904-1908.
 Clarence C. Henson, Principal, 1908-1947.
 Eddie Kalin, Principal, 1948-1964.
 William Cunningham, Headmaster, 1964-1976.
 Theodore Cotonio, Headmaster, 1976-1986.
 Michael Lacopo, Headmaster, 1987-1993.
 Scott McLeod, Headmaster, 1993-2005.
 Woody Price, Head of School, 2005-2007.
 T.J. Locke, Head of School, 2007–2013.
 Dale Smith, Head of School, 2013–present

Notable alumni

 Marion Abramson – civic leader, founder of WYES-TV
 Conrad Appel – Metairie industrialist and Republican member of the Louisiana State Senate since 2008.
 Bryan Batt – Broadway stage, film and television actor; star of AMC series Mad Men.
 Odell Beckham Jr. – NFL wide receiver and Super Bowl LVI winner for the Los Angeles Rams, actor and investor. Selected 12th overall in the 2014 NFL draft by the NY Giants. Won 2014 AP NFL Offensive Rookie of the Year Award.
 Jeremy Bleich – American-Israeli baseball player.
 Edward D. Dart – FAIA. Renowned Modernist architect
 Stuart Delery - White House Counsel for Joseph Biden administration, appointed July 2022
 Omar Douglas – former NFL wide receiver for the New York Giants.
 Donald Ensenat – former United States Chief of Protocol and US Ambassador to Brunei.
 Walter Isaacson – historian, former editor of Time magazine, former Chairman and CEO of Cable News Network, and current President of the Aspen Institute.
 Leslie Jacobs – education reform advocate, business executive and philanthropist.
 Corey Johnson – actor, United 93, The Bourne Ultimatum, The Last Days of Lehman Brothers, and The Mummy.
 Michael Lewis – author of best-selling works including Liar's Poker; Moneyball: The Art of Winning an Unfair Game; Coach: Lessons on the Game of Life; The Blind Side: Evolution of a Game; and The Big Short.
 Randy Livingston – professional basketball player and 1993 Gatorade National High School Basketball Player of the Year.
 John C. Lovell – Olympic sailor, silver medalist in Tornado class at 2004 Summer Olympics.
 Ed Miller – author of three best-selling books on poker.
 Arch Manning – grandson of Archie Manning, son of Cooper Manning. High school quarterback.
 Cooper Manning – former football player, oil and stock trader. Eldest son of NFL quarterback Archie Manning.
 Eli Manning – former NFL quarterback for the New York Giants and MVP of Super Bowls XLII and XLVI. Youngest son of NFL quarterback Archie Manning.
 Peyton Manning – Hall of Fame NFL quarterback for the Indianapolis Colts and Denver Broncos, and MVP of Super Bowl XLI. Middle son of former NFL quarterback Archie Manning.
 Bessie Margolin – US Department of Labor attorney from 1939 until 1972, arguing cases before Supreme Court.
 Chris Mooney – journalist and author of the New York Times Best Seller The Republican War on Science.
 Brad A. Myers – Professor of Human Computer Interaction at Carnegie Mellon University.
 Herman Neugass – field and track athlete
 Mark Plotkin – ethnobotanist and advocate for tropical rainforest conservation.
 Christopher Rice – best-selling author of A Density of Souls, The Snow Garden, and Light Before Day; son of author Anne Rice.
 Rilan – pop singer, actor, starred in final season of TV Series Glee.
 Monk Simons – elected to the College Football Hall of Fame in 1963 after playing for Tulane University.
 Bruce Spizer – author of books about The Beatles.
 Sean Tuohy – former professional basketball player, broadcaster for the Memphis Grizzlies of the National Basketball Association; adoptive father of the central figure of The Blind Side, football player Michael Oher.
 Mo Willems – animator, children's book author.
 Mary Louise Wilson – Tony and Drama Desk Award-winning American stage, film and television actress.
 John Minor Wisdom – judge of the United States Court of Appeals for the Fifth Circuit.

References

Further reading
 Konigsmark, Anne Rochell. Isidore Newman School: One Hundred Years, 2004.

External links
 

 Isidore Newman School official website
 Archives of older websites
 Isidore Newman School Archives in the Louisiana Digital Library (in collaboration with the University of New Orleans)

Preparatory schools in Louisiana
Private K-12 schools in New Orleans
Independent Schools Association of the Southwest
Educational institutions established in 1903
1903 establishments in Louisiana